Langelaan is a surname. Notable people with the surname include:

 George Langelaan (1908–1972), British writer and journalist
 Stuart Langelaan (born 1974), British DJ and record producer (known as Lange)